Młosina is a river of Poland. It is a left tributary of the Zbrzyca near Kaszuba, Pomerania.

Rivers of Poland
Rivers of Pomeranian Voivodeship